Michał Bałucki, pseudonym Elpidon (September 29, 1837 in Kraków – October 17, 1901 in Kraków), was a Polish playwright and poet.

Biography
He studied at Saint's Ann gymnasium in Cracow, and then at the Jagiellonian University. He was an active member of a youth organization that wanted to help Poles fighting the tsarist regime in Russian occupied Poland, but he did not fight in the January Uprising. He was sentenced to prison for conspiracy after being arrested at the end of 1863.

He debuted in 1861 with poems based on folklore motifs. In his poems, he attacked Galician aristocrats and the middle class that looked up to them.

At the end of his life he suffered from neurosis and depression and, after a virulently critical article written by Lucjan Rydel, he committed suicide in Błonia Park.

Works
Novels:
 1864 Awakening
 1866 Elders and young 
 1870 Glittering poverty 
 1871 Jewess 
 1872 It is about a piece of land
 1874 From a camp to a camp 
 1875 White Negro (Biały murzyn)
 1881 Lordly beggars 
 1881 Cracow's images 
 1885 In Jewish hands 
 1887 The Mayor from Pipidówka

Comedies:
 1867 Councillor's councillors 
 1871 Hunting a husband 
 1871 Hard-working lazybones 
 1873 Emancipation
 1879 Cousins 
 1880 Neighbours 
 1881 Big shot
 1883 Neighbours: Open house
 1889 Neighbours: Hard times 
 1890 Neighbours: Bachelors' club

References
 E. Rosner, Cieszyńskie okruchy literackie, Cieszyn 1983, s. 14-15.

Bibliography
 Rosner E., Cieszyńskie okruchy literackie, Cieszyn 1983, s. 14-16. 
 Anna Sobiecka, "Michał Bałucki i teatr: wybrane problemy i aspekty", Słupsk 2006,

External links
  Polish Literature in English Translation: Michał Bałucki
 Michał Bałucki at poezja.org
 

Jagiellonian University alumni
Polish male dramatists and playwrights
Burials at Rakowicki Cemetery
1837 births
1901 deaths
19th-century Polish poets
19th-century Polish dramatists and playwrights
Polish male poets
19th-century Polish male writers
1901 suicides
Polish positivists